Alan Hardy may refer to:

 Alan Hardy (producer), Australian writer and producer
 Alan Hardy (rugby league), British rugby league footballer
 Alan Hardy (basketball), American basketball player
 Alan M. Hardy, American diplomat, United States Ambassador to Equatorial Guinea